Piracicaba ( or ) is a city located in the Brazilian state of São Paulo. The population is 407,252 (2020) in an area of 1378.07 km². It is at an elevation of 547 m above sea level.

Name

The place name comes from a word in the Tupi language that means "place where the fish stops", and it is formed by the junction of the terms pirá ("fish"), syk ("stop") e aba ("place")..
The name refers to the waterfalls of the Piracicaba River, which bisects the city, which is a point where the "piracema"—fish swimming upstream to reproduce— are stopped.

History

The settlement  was officially founded on August 1, 1767, as a povoação subordinated to the vila of Itu. In 1784,  Piracicaba gets emancipated from Itu, becoming a freguesia.

In 1821, the freguesia is promoted to vila, known as Vila Nova da Constituição. In  1856, Vila Nova da Constituição is promoted to city status and in 1877 it is officially named "Piracicaba", following a law by the then councilman and future Brazilian president Prudente de Morais. 

In 1944, the city was made the seat of the Roman Catholic Diocese of Piracicaba.

Notable institutions, events, resources

Piracicaba is home to the oldest agricultural university in Brazil, the Luiz de Queiroz School of Agriculture of the University of São Paulo. Founded in 1901, the school is located on a farm with a large collection of trees and plants. It is also recognized as a leader in the field of precision agriculture. Other universities based in Piracicaba are the Methodist University of Piracicaba (UNIMEP) and the  University of Campinas' School of Dentistry.

Piracicaba is known by the nickname "Noiva da Colina" (bride of the hills), and is the annual host to the "Festa das Nações" (Nations' Party, where people may find foods from all over the world), and to the "Salão Internacional do Humor" (International Humor Exhibition), where cartoonists from around the world display comic drawings.

Economy

Piracicaba is famous for sugarcane plantations, traditional cachaça production, and traditional music.

In particular, its economy, as of this year, is fueled by the cultivation of sugarcane. The harvest of sugarcane produces many products, including sugar, oil, and ethanol. Copersucar, a large company that has a center of research on genetic improvement of sugarcane participates in this growing industry.

Another characteristic economic feature is the presence of large industries, where the main ones are Caterpillar, ArcelorMittal, Raizen and Hyundai.

Geography

Piracicaba's altitude is 554 meters.  Temperatures through the year vary from 37.5° Celsius maximum to 16.0° Celsius minimum, and Piracicaba experiences annual rainfall of 123 centimeters. The area of the city is 1,378 square kilometers, making it the 19th largest city in the State of São Paulo. The urban area of Piracicaba is approximately 158 square kilometers, and 95% of the population resides in it.

Demographics

The population in 2019 was 404,142. The Human Development Index for the city was 0.710 in 2000, and 0.785 in 2010, both falling in the "high" category.

Religion 

Like the cultural variety in Piracicaba, there are several religious manifestations in the city. It is possible to find in the city dozens of different Protestant denominations, as well as the practice of Buddhism, Islamism, Spiritism, and others. In the last decades, Buddhism and Eastern religions have grown in the city. There also are the Jewish, Mormon and Afro-Brazilian religions. According to data from the 2019 Census conducted by the IBGE, the population of Piracicaba was composed that year by Catholics (59.78%), Evangelicals (27.42%), no religious affiliation (7.47%), Spiritist (2.9%) and Jehovah's Witnesses (0.95%). The remaining 2.09% of the resident population declared themselves of other denominations or of undetermined religion.

Source: IBGE - Census 2019

Utilities

As of 2010, water and power are supplied at a level approaching 100% of the households. As of 2013  there were approximately 164 telephones, and 333 cars, both statistics per thousand people.

Notable people
José Altafini, also known as "Mazola", a Brazilian footballer.
Jonathan Cafú, footballer
André Cypriano, documentary photographer
Evaristo Conrado Engelberg, engineer and inventor
Ronaldo Guiaro, footballer
Marcos Pizzelli-Brazilian footballer.
Rubens Ometto Silveira Mello, owner of Cosan.

Sister cities
  Seongnam, Gyeonggi Province, South Korea
  Santa Ana, El Salvador

References

External links

 
Populated places established in 1767
1767 establishments in Brazil